Scopula montivaga is a moth of the  family Geometridae. It is found on Sulawesi.

References

Moths described in 1922
montivaga
Moths of Indonesia